Colin Atkinson (6 November 1951 – 21 May 2019) was a New Zealand cricketer. He played in ten first-class and five List A matches for Central Districts from 1975 to 1982. Following his playing career, he also became a cricket coach.

See also
 List of Central Districts representative cricketers

References

External links
 

1951 births
2019 deaths
New Zealand cricketers
Central Districts cricketers
People from Taumarunui